David Moore (born 3 March 1986 in Dublin) is a former rugby union player for Connacht Rugby. His favored position was scrum half. (dead Link, here is the archived web site as of 25 August 2016)

References

 http://www.connachtrugby.ie/2011072082546/dave-moore-201112
 http://www.connachtrugby.ie/2012032182792/4-players-commit-futures-to-connacht

Living people
Irish rugby union players
1987 births
Rugby union scrum-halves